The Rural Education and Development (READ) Foundation is a non-profit educational network in North Pakistan.  

It runs a network of 390 schools across Pakistan (Sialkot, Jhelum, Gujrat, Kharian),  Azad Kashmir (All Districts), Murree, Gilgit-Baltistan,  Khyber Pakhtunkhwa and the outskirts of Islamabad/Rawalpindi. It has 5948 teachers and serves 112,006 children including 11341 orphans.

References

Educational institutions established in 1994
1994 establishments in Pakistan
Educational organisations based in Pakistan
Rural development in Pakistan
Schools in Azad Kashmir
Islamic schools in Pakistan